Eric Healy (5 November 1888 – 9 October 1954) was an Australian cricketer. He played one first-class match for Western Australia in 1920/21.

References

External links
 

1888 births
1954 deaths
Australian cricketers
Western Australia cricketers
Cricketers from Sydney